Michael O'Brien  (13 April 1948 – 6 May 2015) was an English historian, specialising in the intellectual history of the American South. He was Professor of American Intellectual History at the University of Cambridge from 2005 to 2015.

Life
Michael O'Brien was born in Plymouth, and was educated at Devonport High School in the city. He was an undergraduate and research student at Trinity Hall, Cambridge in the late 1960s and early 1970s, and studied for a further postgraduate degree at Vanderbilt University. He then taught at University of Michigan, University of Arkansas, Miami University. He was a fellow of Jesus College, Cambridge from 2002 until his death in 2015.

Awards
 Woodward-Franklin Award for the Writing of Southern History, from the Fellowship of Southern Writers (2013)
 Fellow of the British Academy (2008).
 2005 Merle Curti Award
 Bancroft Prize, Columbia University
 Frank L. and Harriet C. Owsley Award, Southern Historical Association
 C. Hugh Holman Award, Society for the Study of Southern Literature
 American Studies Network Book Prize
 Nominated Finalist for the Pulitzer Prize in History
 Nominated Finalist for the Pulitzer Prize in Biography

Bibliography

References

External links
"Of Cats, Historians, and Gardeners", Journal of American History, June 2002

1948 births
2015 deaths
American historians
Alumni of Trinity Hall, Cambridge
Historians of the Southern United States
University of Michigan faculty
University of Arkansas faculty
Miami University faculty
Fellows of Jesus College, Cambridge
Fellows of the British Academy
Bancroft Prize winners